Liao Liou-yi (born 29 October 1947) is a Taiwanese politician. He served as secretary-general of the Presidential Office, interior minister and secretary-general of the Kuomintang.

He was a president of Association of East Asian Relations from February 2012 to 2013. He signed a fishing rights accord for waters near Senkaku Islands on behalf of Taiwan in April 2013. He tendered his resignation as head of the Association of East Asian Relations in May 2013.

Personal life
He was born to a Japanese mother and a Taiwanese father in 1947. He was graduated from the Department of Statistics of Feng Chia University. He is a father of three daughters.

References

Taiwanese Ministers of the Interior
Taiwanese politicians of Japanese descent
Living people
1956 births
People First Party (Taiwan) politicians
Politicians of the Republic of China on Taiwan from New Taipei
Academic staff of the National Taiwan University
Taiwanese educators